Marie-France Alvarez is a French actress. Born in Paris, from a Congolese mother and a Spanish father, she trained at LAMDA in London and L'école des Enfants Terribles in Paris.

Career 
Her first appearance on British Television was in the role of Carmen  in the BBC mini-series Criminal Justice directed by  Yann Demange. In 2017 she played Mademoiselle Dubois in Paddington 2. Theatre credits include  Pinter's collage ‘Democractie(s)’ performed in  Festival d'Avignon Off, ‘Paradise’ at the  Arcola Theatre or the lead role in ‘ Berenice ’ with the Klein Leonarte Theater company. In 2019, she joined the cast of The Crucible at the Théâtre de la Ville.

Filmography

References

External links
Alvarez IMDb
Allociné
Bibliothèque nationale de France (BNF)
Unifrance
Théâtre Contemporain
Agence Artistique//Agency  UBBA 

French actresses
21st-century French actresses
Living people
Year of birth missing (living people)